Hendrik (Hein) Delsen (13 January 1895 – 13 November 1954) was a Dutch footballer. He played in three matches for the Netherlands national football team from 1921 to 1922.

Personal life
Hein was born in Nieuwer-Amstel, the son of Hendrik Delsen and Johanna Maria Kok. He was married to Lena Elisabeth van de Linde and had a daughter.

His younger brother   was also a football player and trainer.

Career statistics

Sources

References

External links
 

1895 births
1954 deaths
Sportspeople from Amstelveen
Dutch footballers
Association football forwards
Amsterdamsche FC players
AFC Ajax players
Netherlands international footballers
Footballers from North Holland